Chung Ling Private High School is a Chinese independent high school in George Town, Penang, Malaysia. Its affiliated schools are Chung Ling High School and Chung Ling Butterworth High School.

The school was established in 1962 to provide education for students who were ineligible to attend Malaysian public schools because they were considered overaged by the Malaysian Ministry of Education . It is one of the 60 Chinese Independent High Schools in Malaysia. Chung Ling Private High School provides secondary education in the Chinese language, with the medium of instruction being Mandarin using simplified Chinese characters.

Chung Ling Private High School is the first secondary school in South-East Asia to fully adopt Cambridge English courses. It was awarded five stars in SKIPS (the Private Education Institution Quality Standard Certificate) by the Ministry of Education (Malaysia) in 2016, and is ranked as one of the top 5 private high schools in Malaysia.

Notable alumni 

 Khaw Boon Wan,  serving as the Coordinating Minister for Infrastructure and the Minister for Transport in Singapore since 2015

References

External links

Schools in Penang
Private schools in Malaysia
Educational institutions established in 1962
Chinese-language schools in Malaysia
1962 establishments in Malaya